Tymoshenko, Timoshenko, or Tsimashenka/Cimašenka is a surname of Ukrainian origin. It derives from the Christian name Timothy, and its Ukrainian derivatives, Tymofiy or Tymish. The surname, Tymoshenko, was created by adding the Ukrainian patronymic suffix, -enko,  meaning someone of Tymish, usually the son of Tymish.

Notable people

Tymoshenko
 Eugenia Tymoshenko (born 1980), Ukrainian businesswoman, daughter of Yulia
 Illya Tymoshenko (born 1999), Ukrainian footballer
 Kyrylo Tymoshenko (born 1989), Ukrainian statesman
 Maksym Tymoshenko (born 1972), Ukrainian culturologist and social activist
 Oleksandr Tymoshenko (born 1960), Ukrainian businessman, husband of Yulia
 Olexandra Tymoshenko (born 1972), Soviet-Ukrainian rhythmic gymnast
 Yulia Tymoshenko (born 1960), former Prime Minister of Ukraine

Timoshenko
 Daria Timoshenko (born 1980), Russian-Azerbaijani figure skater
 Semyon Timoshenko (1895–1970), Soviet-Ukrainian military commander
 Stephen Timoshenko (1878–1972), Russian-Ukrainian engineer
 Yevgeniy Timoshenko (born 1988), Ukrainian-American poker player

Tsimashenka
 Alyaksey Tsimashenka (born 1986), Belarusian footballer

See also
 
 
 Eastern Slavic naming customs
 Murder of Russel Timoshenko, incident in which a 23-year-old NYPD officer was shot and killed during a traffic stop.
 Timoshenko Medal, awarded for contributions in applied mechanics.
 Timoshenko beam theory
 Timoleón Jiménez (nicknamed Timochenko), Colombian FARC commander.

External links
 The origin of names and surnames

Ukrainian-language surnames
Patronymic surnames
Surnames from given names